Most of the Bangladeshi patriotic songs were written during 1971 War of Independence, to inspire the freedom fighters.

This is a list of Bangladeshi patriotic songs. 

"Aar Juddho Noy"
"Akbar Jete Dena" - sung by Sabina Yasmin and Shahnaz Rahmatullah in different versions
"Aktara Tui Deser Kotha" - sung by Sabina Yasmin and Shahnaz Rahmatullah in different versions
"Akti Bangladesh" - sung by Sabina Yasmin and Konok Chapa in different versions
"Amar Desher Matir Gondhe" 
"Amar Shonar Bangla" - National anthem of Bangladesh, written by Rabindranath Tagore
"Amar Vaier Rokte Rangano" - written by Abdul Gaffar Chowdhury and composed by Altaf Mahmud during 1952 Bengali language movement.
"Amay Jodi Prosno Kore" - sung by Sabina Yasmin
"Ami Banglai Gaan Gaai"- composed by Pratil Mukhopadday
"Ami Bhalobashi Ei Banglake"
"Bangladesh" - by Ayub Bachchu
"Bhalobashi Deshta Amar"
"Ei Padhama Ei Meghna"
"Eki Oporup Rupe Ma Tor" - sung by Konok Chapa
"Ek Nodi Rokta Periye" - sung by Shahnaz Rahmatullah
"Ek Sagar Rokter Binimoye"
"Bangladesh" - written by Prince Mahmood sung by James
"Jodi Abar Ashte Pari"
"Jonmo Amar Dhonno Holo" - Written by Nayeem Gahar and sung by Sabina Yasmin and Konok Chapa- in different versions
"Joy Bangla Banglar Joy" 
"Karar Oi Louho Kopath" 
"Meghe Bhasa Neel Akash (music.com.bd).mp35.3 MBModer Gorob Moder Asha" - written by Atulprasad Sen
"Mora Ekti Ful Ke" - 
"Amar Aat Koti Ful" - 
"Amar Bangla Ma Tor"
"O Amar Desher Mati" by Rabindranath Tagore
"Polash Dake Kokoil Dake" 
Praner Anonde Baje" -
"Purbo Digonte Surjo Utheche" - written and composed by Gautam Haldar
Shadhinota Tomake Niye" 
"Sobkota Janala Khule Dau Na" - sung by Sabina Yasmin
"O Alor Pothojatri" - sung by Manna Dey
"Muktir Gaan"
"Ek Sagor Rokter Binimoye" - sung by Shahin Samad

References

Patriotic
Bangladesh